Levenhookia leptantha, the trumpet stylewort, is a dicotyledonous plant that belongs to the genus Levenhookia (family Stylidiaceae). Flowers are pink and bloom from September to October in its native range. It is endemic to Western Australia. Its habitat has been reported as being sand or sandy clay soils in granite outcrops and winter-wet depressions.

References

Endemic flora of Western Australia
Eudicots of Western Australia
leptantha
Plants described in 1869